Wharton is an unincorporated community and coal town on the Pond Fork River in Boone County in the U.S. state of West Virginia. Wharton lies along West Virginia Route 85. Wharton was named for Joseph Wharton, a large landowner from Philadelphia.

Mining accident
On February 1, 2006, a miner was killed at Long Branch Energy's #18 mine in Wharton when a wall support popped loose. This fatality along with another one in a separate incident in Uneeda, also in Boone County, caused West Virginia Governor Joe Manchin to call for a "stand-down on mine safety" at West Virginia's mines. 

Unincorporated communities in Boone County, West Virginia
Coal towns in West Virginia